Cay Sal Airport  was an airport located on Cay Sal, the Bahamas. The airstrip which was built there during WWII is now abandoned according to aerial imagery.

See also
List of airports in the Bahamas

References

External links 
 Airport record for Cay Sal Airport at Landings.com

Airports in the Bahamas